The Glass Menagerie is a 1973 American made-for-television drama film based on the 1944 play of the same name by Tennessee Williams. It is directed by Anthony Harvey and stars Katharine Hepburn, Sam Waterston, Joanna Miles and Michael Moriarty. It marked the third screen adaptation of the play.

The Glass Menagerie was Katharine Hepburn's first appearance on television. She had initially been wary of the medium, but was convinced by the opportunity to work with friend Anthony Harvey, with whom she had made the successful film The Lion in Winter. Hepburn was also drawn to the project when she was told her niece Katharine Houghton could co-star as Laura, but Houghton eventually turned down the role.

The Glass Menagerie was one of the major television events of 1973, commanding high ratings. It received four Primetime Emmy Awards.

Cast
 Katharine Hepburn as Amanda Wingfield, the ex-Southern belle who has been abandoned by her husband and longs for the kind of Old South gentility and comforts which she remembers from her youth for her children.
 Sam Waterston as Tom Wingfield, Amanda's son who works in a warehouse but aspires to be a writer. He feels both obligated toward yet burdened by his family.
 Joanna Miles as Laura Wingfield, Amanda's shy and extra-sensitive daughter.
 Michael Moriarty as Jim O'Connor, a workmate of Tom's who is invited to the Wingfields' house for dinner with the intent of being Laura's first gentleman caller.

Wins and nominations
At the 26th Primetime Emmy Awards:
 Win for Best Supporting Actor in a Drama - Michael Moriarty
 Win for Best Supporting Actress in a Drama - Joanna Miles
 Win for Supporting Actor of the Year - Michael Moriarty
 Win for Supporting Actress of the Year - Joanna Miles
 Nomination for Best Actress in a Drama - Katharine Hepburn
 Nomination for Best Supporting Actor in a Drama - Sam Waterston

At the 1974 Directors Guild of America Awards:
 Nomination for Outstanding Directorial Achievement in Movies for Television - Anthony Harvey

See also
 List of American films of 1973

References

External links

1973 television films
1973 films
1973 drama films
Glass Menagerie, The 1973
Glass Menagerie, The 1973
Television series produced at Pinewood Studios
Films directed by Anthony Harvey
Films scored by John Barry (composer)
Glass Menagerie, The 1973
Glass Menagerie, The 1973
Glass Menagerie, The 1973
1970s English-language films